Classification is a figure of speech linking a proper noun to a common noun using the or other articles.

Example 
 "Finland, the land of a thousand lakes."
 "Japan, the land of the rising sun."

References 

Figures of speech